The 2007 Chrono des Nations was the 26th edition of the Chrono des Nations cycle race and was held on 21 October 2007. The race started and finished in Les Herbiers. The race was won by László Bodrogi.

General classification

References

2007
2007 in road cycling
2007 in French sport
October 2007 sports events in France